The Board of Curators of the University of Missouri is a body consisting of nine members that governs the University of Missouri System, four state universities in the U.S. state of Missouri.  In addition to these four universities, it also supervises and coordinates University of Missouri Health Care, the University of Missouri Extension, and a number of research locations across the state. Refer to the list of colleges and universities for details on the individual schools.

History
From 1839-1963 the board governed the University of Missouri in Columbia, Missouri. In 1963, upon the formation of the University of Missouri System, the Curators assumed leadership, appointing a President of the University of Missouri System, in addition to chancellors to lead each campus.

Member selection 
The Board of Curators has nine members, each of whom is appointed by the Governor of Missouri with the advice and consent of the Missouri Senate. Curators serve six-year terms, staggered by three positions expiring every two years. Not more than one curator can be appointed from the same congressional district, and no more than five curators can belong to the same political party. In addition, there is a non-voting student representative to the board, likewise appointed and confirmed, who serves a two-year term. The post is rotated among the four universities. Presently, the post is held by Avery Welker from the S&T campus.

The board of curators selects the president of the system, who reports to the board along with the general counsel. Each campus is led by a chancellor who reports to the president, as does an executive vice president, four vice presidents, and a chief of staff. The president chairs the University of Missouri Health System advisory board. Each Board Member also serves on various committees that address higher education issues.

Julia G. Brncic, District 1, St. Louis
Darryl M. Chatman, District 3, O'Fallon
Todd P. Graves, District 6, Edgerton
Greg E. Hoberock, District 3, Washington
Keith A. Holloway, District 8, Cape Girardeau
Jeffrey L. Layman, District 7, Springfield
Robin R. Wenneker, District 4, Columbia
Michael A. Williams, District 5 Kansas City

Notable past Curators
Thomas M. Allen
Alban Jasper Conant
William P. Elmer
David Henry Hickman
James S. Rollins
Gideon Frank Rothwell
Edwin William Stephens
William Franklin Switzler

Schools governed by the Board of Curators
The Curators oversee 4 institutions, one of which, the University of Missouri is the flagship of the system.

See also 
List of colleges and universities in Missouri
Education in Missouri

References 

Viles, Jonas The University of Missouri, 1839–1939, E.W. Stephens Publishing Company

External links 
 

University of Missouri System
University of Missouri
Governing bodies of universities and colleges in the United States